Arthur Charles Frecker (20 September 1901 – 13 January 1967) was an Australian rules footballer who played for the Hawthorn Football Club in the Victorian Football League (VFL).

Notes

External links 

1901 births
1967 deaths
Australian rules footballers from Victoria (Australia)
Hawthorn Football Club players